Leleuvia (pronounced ) is a coral cay in Fiji's Lomaiviti archipelago.  The  islet is the site of the Leleuvia Island Resort, previously operated by the Chinese-Fijian businessman Emosi Yee Shaw. Only recently in early 2006 has the Island been leased by a Company called Saluwaki Limited with the intention to refurbish the island resort. Leleuvia Island is popular among beachcombers and kite surfers. There is snorkelling directly off the beach.

External links
Official Website

Islands of Fiji
Lomaiviti Province
Private islands of Fiji